Susan Speiran is a Canadian skeleton racer who competed in the 1990s. She is best known for her third place overall Skeleton World Cup title finish in 1997-8.

Speiran married and is now known as Susan Adams. She won the Canadian championship in women's skeleton four times.

References
Davenport sleds photo including Speiran
List of women's skeleton World Cup champions since 1997.
Skeltonsport.com profile

Canadian female skeleton racers
Living people
Year of birth missing (living people)
20th-century Canadian women